In human anatomy, the inguinal  region refers to either the groin or the lower lateral regions of the abdomen. It may also refer to:

 Conjoint tendon, previously known as the inguinal aponeurotic falx, a structure formed from the transversus abdominis insertion into the pecten pubis
 Granuloma inguinale, a bacterial disease characterized by ulcerative genital lesions that is endemic in many less developed regions
 Inguinal canal, a passage in the anterior abdominal wall which in men conveys the spermatic cord and in women the round ligament
 Inguinal falx, the conjoined tendon of the obliquus internus and transversus muscles
 Inguinal hernia, a protrusion of abdominal-cavity contents through the inguinal canal
 Direct inguinal hernia, a type of inguinal hernia with a sac that is medial to the inferior epigastric vessels
 Indirect inguinal hernia, a hernia that results from the failure of the embryonic internal inguinal ring after the testicle has passed through it
 Inguinal ligament, a ligament that runs from the pubic tubercle to the anterior superior iliac spine
 Inguinal lymph node a type of lymph node in the inguinal region
 Deep inguinal lymph nodes, three to five deep lymph nodes that are located medial to the femoral vein and under the cribriform fascia
 Superficial inguinal lymph nodes, ten superficial lymph nodes that form a chain immediately below the inguinal ligament
 Inguinal orchiectomy, a surgical procedure to remove a testicle
 Inguinal ring, the two openings of the inguinal canal
 Deep inguinal ring, the entrance to the inguinal canal
 Superficial inguinal ring, a triangular opening that forms the exit of the inguinal canal
 Inguinal triangle, a region of the abdominal wall, also known by the eponym Hesselbach's triangle
 Lateral inguinal fossa, a shallow concave stretch of peritoneum on the deep surface of the anterior abdominal wall
 Medial inguinal fossa a depression located within the inguinal triangle on the peritoneal surface of the anterior abdominal wall
 Reflected inguinal ligament, a triangular layer of tendinous fibers formed by the medial fibers of the external abdominal oblique aponeurosis